Events in the year 1770 in Norway.

Incumbents
Monarch: Christian VII

Events
26 January - Jacob Benzon is appointed Steward of Norway.

Arts and literature

26 January - Ballet was performed by Madame Stuart, possibly the first ballet ever performed in Oslo.

Full date unknown
The construction of Eidsvollsbygningen was finished.

Births
25 April - Georg Sverdrup, philologist (died 1850)
4 August - Christen Thorn Aamodt, priest (died 1836)

Full date unknown
Anders Trulsson Bruland, civil servant and politician (died 1818)

Deaths
19 April – Jürgen Christoph von Koppelow,  nobleman and officer (born 1684)
10 September – Michael Heltzen, mining engineer (born 1712).

See also

References